Oregon-Davis Junior-Senior High School serves the town of Hamlet, Indiana and surrounding communities in Starke County. It is administered by the Oregon-Davis School Corporation. It is a consolidation of Hamlet & Grovertown high schools.

Athletics
In the 2006–2007 season, Oregon-Davis won both the boys and girls class A state basketball titles.  The following sports are offered at Oregon-Davis:

Boys
Basketball
Baseball
Cross country
Soccer
Swimming

Girls
Basketball
Cross country
Golf
Swimming
Volleyball

See also
 List of high schools in Indiana

References

External links
 

Public high schools in Indiana
Schools in Starke County, Indiana
Public middle schools in Indiana
1968 establishments in Indiana